The 1976 Saint John's Johnnies football team represented Saint John's University as a member of the Minnesota Intercollegiate Athletic Conference (MIAC) during the 1976 NCAA Division III football season. In their 24th season under head coach John Gagliardi, the Johnnies compiled a 10–0–1 record and won the NCAA Division III national championship.

The Johnnies closed their season facing  in the Amos Alonzo Stagg Bowl to determine the Division III championship. Saint John's took a 28-0 lead through three quarters, but Towson State scored 28 points in the fourth quarter to tie the score. Saint John's kicker Jeff Norman kicked a 19-yard field goal with one second remaining to secure the victory.

Eight Saint John's players were included on the 1976 All-MIAC team: quarterback Jeff Norman; fullback Tim Schmitz; running back Jim Roeder; offensive lineman Dave Grovum; defensive lineman Ernie England, Terry Sexton and Joe Wentzel; and defensive back Joe Luby.

Coach Gagliardi received the 1976 NCAA Division III Coach of the Year award. Gagliardi became college football all-time winningest coach and was inducted into the College Football Hall of Fame in 2006.

The team played its home games at Clemens Stadium in Collegeville, Minnesota.

Schedule

References

Saint John's
Saint John's Johnnies football seasons
NCAA Division III Football Champions
Minnesota Intercollegiate Athletic Conference football champion seasons
Saint John's Johnnies football
College football undefeated seasons